Harold Robert Monar (31 August 1884 – 20 September 1963) was an Australian rules footballer who played with St Kilda in the Victorian Football League (VFL).

Notes

External links 

1884 births
1963 deaths
Australian rules footballers from Victoria (Australia)
St Kilda Football Club players
Williamstown Football Club players